Burnett may refer to:

Places
Antarctica
Burnett Island, an island in the Swain Islands
Australia
Burnett County, New South Wales, a cadastral division 
 The Burnett River in Queensland
 Burnett Heads, Queensland
 Shire of Burnett, a former local government area in Queensland
 Electoral district of Burnett, Queensland, Australia

Canada
 Burnett Bay, Northwest Territoes
Burnett Inlet, Nunavut

United Kingdom
 Burnett, Somerset, England

United States
Burnett, Illinois, an unincorporated community
 Burnett, Indiana, an unincorporated town
Burnett, Minnesota, an unincorporated community
Burnett, Washington, an unincorporated community
 Burnett, Wisconsin, a town
 Burnett (CDP), Wisconsin, an unincorporated census-designated place
 Burnett County, Wisconsin
 Burnett Township (disambiguation)

People
Burnett (surname), people whose last name is Burnett
Clan Burnett, a Scottish clan
Burnett Baronets, one Nova Scotia baronetcy and one UK baronetcy

Other uses
5798 Burnett, an asteroid

See also
 Burnet (disambiguation)
 Burnette (disambiguation)
 Justice Burnett (disambiguation)
, including people with first name Burnett